George C. Junkin (1858–1935) was an American politician and businessman who served as the 14th Secretary of State in Nebraska. Junkin previously served in both chambers of the Nebraska Legislature.

Early life 
Junkin was born in Salina, Iowa on June 9, 1858.

Career 
Prior to entering politics, Junkin lived in Montana. He eventually relocated to Gosper County, Nebraska, where he worked as a rancher. Junkin represented the 66th district of the Nebraska House of Representatives. Junkin later served as a member of the Nebraska Senate from the 28th district.

Personal life 
Junkin married Emma May Swinburne of Delhi, Iowa in 1885. They had two sons and a daughter. Junkin died March 15, 1935, and is interred in Elwood, Nebraska.

References

1858 births
1935 deaths
Secretaries of State of Nebraska
Republican Party members of the Nebraska House of Representatives
People from Jefferson County, Iowa